Julefrid med Carola is a Christmas EP from Swedish pop singer Carola Häggkvist. It was released on 6 December 1983.

Track listing

Side A
Hej mitt vinterland
Nu tändas tusen juleljus
Härlig är jorden

Side B
Bjällerklang
Stilla natt
O helga natt

Charts

References

Carola Häggkvist albums
1983 EPs
EPs by Swedish artists
1983 Christmas albums
Christmas albums by Swedish artists
Christmas EPs
Swedish-language albums